Paulina Campos (born 13 April 2000) is a Mexican artistic gymnast. She won the silver medal in the women's balance beam event at the 2018 Pacific Rim Gymnastics Championships held in Medellín, Colombia. In 2018, she also won the bronze medal in the women's team all-around event at the Central American and Caribbean Games held in Barranquilla, Colombia.

In 2019, she represented Mexico at the Pan American Games held in Lima, Peru. In the women's artistic individual all-around event she finished in 18th place. In the women's artistic team all-around event she was part of the Mexican team and they finished in 7th place.

References

External links 
 

Living people
2000 births
Place of birth missing (living people)
Mexican female artistic gymnasts
Gymnasts at the 2019 Pan American Games
Pan American Games competitors for Mexico
Competitors at the 2018 Central American and Caribbean Games
Central American and Caribbean Games medalists in gymnastics
Central American and Caribbean Games bronze medalists for Mexico
21st-century Mexican women